The 1991–92 WHL season was the 26th season for the Western Hockey League.  Fifteen teams completed a 72-game season.  The Kamloops Blazers won the President's Cup before going on to win the Memorial Cup.

League notes
The Tacoma Rockets joined the WHL as its 15th franchise, playing in the West Division.

Regular season

Final standings

Scoring leaders
Note: GP = Games played; G = Goals; A = Assists; Pts = Points; PIM = Penalties in minutes

Players
 Trades
 June 27, 1991 — the Tacoma Rockets acquire Trevor Pennock from the Seattle Thunderbirds, in exchange for Lloyd Shaw.

1992 WHL Playoffs

All-Star game

On February 5, the WHL All-Stars defeated a combined QMJHL/OHL All-Star team 5–4 in double overtime at Saskatoon, Saskatchewan before a crowd of 4,519.

WHL awards

All-Star Teams

See also
 1992 Memorial Cup
 1992 NHL Entry Draft
 1991 in sports
 1992 in sports

References

Bibliography

 2005–06 WHL Guide

External links
 Official website of the Western Hockey League
 Official website of the Canadian Hockey League

Western Hockey League seasons
WHL
WHL